Jacqueline "Jackie" T. Addison (born September 14, 1962) is an American politician who is a member of the Maryland House of Delegates for District 45 in Baltimore City.

Background
In 2020, Addison unsuccessfully ran for District 13 of the Baltimore City Council, seeking to replace councilwoman Shannon Sneed, who unsuccessfully ran for council president. She ran on a ticket with outgoing council president Brandon Scott and received support from the American Federation of State, County and Municipal Employees Council 3. She lost the Democratic primary to Antonio Glover, placing second with 26.9 percent of the vote.

In 2022, Addison ran for the Maryland House of Delegates in District 45, running on a ticket with state senator Cory V. McCray and Caylin Young, the director of the Baltimore City Office of Equity and Civil Rights. She won the Democratic primary on July 19, placing first with 25.3 percent of the vote.

In the legislature
Addison was sworn into the Maryland House of Delegates on January 11, 2023, with the start of the Maryland General Assembly's 445th legislative session. She is a member of the House Environment and Transportation Committee.

Personal life
Addison has lived in the Belair-Edison neighborhood of Baltimore for over 30 years.

Electoral history

References

External links
 

1962 births
21st-century African-American women
21st-century African-American politicians
21st-century American politicians
21st-century American women politicians
African-American state legislators in Maryland
African-American women in politics
Democratic Party members of the Maryland House of Delegates
Living people
Women state legislators in Maryland